Hmaé is a surname. Notable people with the surname include:

Michel Hmaé (born 1978), New Caledonian footballer
José Hmaé (born 1978), New Caledonian footballer